Dithmar Blefken was a German preacher and minor 17th century geographer. Little is known about his life. He was a preacher in Hessen (Germany) 1594, Zoelen (Holland) 1597-1598, Wijk bij Duurstede (Holland) 1598-1603, Giessen (Holland) 1603-1609, in 1614 he still lives in Giessen.

Blefken is known for Islandia (complete name Islandia, sive Populorum & mirabilium quae in ea Insula reperiuntur accuratior descriptio), a description of Iceland published first in 1607 in Leiden. He claimed it to be based on his journey to the island while accompanying merchants from Hamburg; this is, however, not certain. Arngrímur Jónsson, a contemporary Icelandic scholar, was a fierce critic of Blefken's work (as well as of other authors). Although the book contained many inaccuracies it was quite influential at the time, especially in northern parts of Europe.

Notes

Literature 
 Monique Mund-Dopchie (Université catholique de Louvain): A beau mentir qui vient de loin: défaillances de la mémoire et forgeries dans l´Islandia du voyageur Dithmar Blefken (1cre éd. 1607), in Neulateinisches Jahrbuch, 2004, .
 Wolfgang Müller: Neue Nordwelt, 2005, . The German language book summarizes descriptions of Iceland by several authors, including Blefken.

External links
 1903 Biography of Blefken from the Allgemeine Deutsche Biographie on German Wikisource

German geographers
Year of birth missing
Year of death missing